Liberty is a village in the Canadian province of Saskatchewan within the Rural Municipality of Big Arm No. 251 and Census Division No. 11.

History 
Liberty incorporated as a village on January 23, 1912.

Demographics 

See also 

 List of communities in Saskatchewan
 List of villages in Saskatchewan

References

Villages in Saskatchewan
Big Arm No. 251, Saskatchewan
Division No. 11, Saskatchewan